Randal Graham is a Canadian law professor, novelist, and the Goodmans LLP Faculty Fellow in legal ethics at the University of Western Ontario Faculty of Law.

Early life and education
Originally from Peterborough, Ontario, Graham earned a Bachelor of Laws from Osgoode Hall Law School at York University, followed by a Doctor of Philosophy from the same institution in 1999. While completing his dissertation, Graham worked under the supervision of Peter Hogg, for whom he had worked as a research assistant throughout his time in the LL.B. program.

Career
From 1996 to 1997, Graham clerked at the Supreme Court of Canada under Mr. Justice John Sopinka after which he practised commercial law at Goodmans LLP. He served as an adjunct professor at Osgoode Hall Law School and an assistant professor at the University of New Brunswick before coming to the University of Western Ontario Faculty of Law in 2002, soon earning tenure and full professorship. In 2005, Graham was named "Faculty Scholar" for the international impact of his research. He has won awards for outstanding teaching, including the Edward G. Pleva Award for Excellence in Teaching, Western University's highest teaching-related honour.

In 2016, Graham testified in front of the Standing Senate Committee on Legal and Constitutional Affairs of the Senate of Canada regarding Bill C-14, An Act to amend the Criminal Code and to make related amendments to other Acts (medical assistance in dying) relating to euthanasia in Canada.

In 2017, Graham published his first novel, Beforelife, followed by its sequel, Afterlife Crisis, in 2020. Raoul Bhaneja narrated the audiobook version of Afterlife Crisis. The third novel of the trilogy, Nether Regions, was released in September 2022.

Beforelife won the Independent Publisher Book Awards Gold Medal for Fantasy Fiction. Both Beforelife and Afterlife Crisis were top ten finalists for the Stephen Leacock Memorial Medal for Humour.

Singer-songwriter, Treasa Levasseur, described Graham's Afterlife Crisis for CBC Radio The Next Chapter (radio program) as ". . . a sprawling, intellectual yet humorous book - like if Life of Brian by Monty Python was 14-and-a-half hours long and was written by a law professor at Western University."

Heather McBriarty of The Miramichi Reader described Graham's Nether Regions as ". . . a hilariously thought-provoking romp of a book in the finest tradition of Neil Gaiman, Douglas Adams, and Terry Pratchett.  McBriarty noted, "Graham draws from both today's headlines and ancient myths to create a world like no other, and never hesitates to ask huge philosophical questions in the most outlandish of settings."

Publications

Books
Statutory Interpretation: Theory and Practice. Toronto: Emond, 2001 ISBN 978-1-55239-063-4.
Statutory Interpretation: Cases, Text and Materials. Toronto: Emond, 2002 ISBN 978-1-55239-091-7.
Legal Ethics: Theories, Cases, and Professional Regulation. 3rd Edition (2nd Edition 2014; 1st Edition 2004). Toronto: Emond, 2014 ISBN 978-1-55239-623-0.
Beforelife. Toronto: ECW Press, 2017 ISBN 9781770413177.
Afterlife Crisis. Toronto: ECW Press, 2020 ISBN 9781770414709.
Nether Regions. Toronto: ECW Press, 2022 ISBN 9781770414716.

Selected articles
 Morality v. Markets (2005) 8:1 Legal Ethics 87.
 In Defence of Ethinomics (2005) 8:1 Legal Ethics 160.
 Right Theory, Wrong Reasons (2006) 34 SCLR (2d) 1.
 "What Judges Want: Judicial Self-Interest and Statutory Interpretation" (2009)Statute Law Review 30(1) 38 -72, Oxford University Press.
 Evolutionary Analysis: The Impact of Interpretive Theory (2010) 34 Man. LJ 1, 143.
 The Myth of Originalism (appearing in Interpretatio Non Cessat, Yvon Blais), 2011.

Videos
Building Accessibility for People with Disabilities into our Legislation: Avoiding the Creation of Unintended Barriers, 8 May 2016.
Beforelife CBC Interview, 8 September 2017.
Second Beforelife CBC Interview, 13 April 2018.
Homecoming 2020 Western Law Ethics Webinar, 20 October 2020.
Commencement Speech to Professional Graduates, Western University, 8 July 2022 (at 34 minute mark).

References

External links
 Western Law Faculty Profile

Living people
Canadian legal scholars
Academic staff of the University of Western Ontario
Law clerks
People from Peterborough, Ontario
Year of birth missing (living people)